The Lillooet Ranges are the southeasternmost subdivision of the Pacific Ranges of the Coast Mountains of British Columbia.  They are located between the drainage of the Lillooet River and Harrison Lake on the west and the canyon of the Fraser River on the east, and by the lowland coastal valley of that river on the south.

The Lillooet Ranges are approximately 8100 square kilometres (3150 mi²) in area. The range is extremely rugged and varied in terrain, and includes some of the highest peaks in southwestern British Columbia. The highest is Skihist Mountain, crowning the Cantilever Range in the heart of the area to the west of the community of Lytton at the confluence of the Thompson and Fraser Rivers. The northernmost subdivision of the Lillooet Ranges is the Cayoosh Range, which includes the second-highest summit in the Lillooet Ranges, an unnamed  peak just south of Seton Lake and about  WSW of the town of Lillooet.

There are a number of provincial parks and recreation areas within the boundaries of the Lillooet Ranges.  The largest and most important is the Stein Valley Nlaka'pamux Heritage Park, which takes in the entire Stein River basin, immediately west of Lytton and east of Pemberton-Mount Currie.  "The Stein" is the largest unlogged watershed in the southern Coast Mountains and, like the rest of the Lillooet Ranges, varies from coastal-type alpine in the west to desert-canyon arid on its east.

There is only one highway traversing the Lillooet Ranges, Hwy 99 from Mount Currie to Lillooet, via the valley of Cayoosh Creek.  North of that highway is the subarea known as the Cayoosh Range, which contains the second-highest peak in the Lillooet Ranges, an unnamed summit just south of Seton Lake.

The main watersheds entirely within the Lillooet Ranges are those of Cayoosh Creek, the Stein River, the Nahatlatch River, and the Silver River (a.k.a. the Big Silver River).    Many smaller streams, still of considerable size, are not listed here.

References

External links 
Bridge River-Lillooet Country Archive
Lillooet Ranges entry in the Canadian Mountain Encyclopedia

 
Pacific Ranges